Mauro Facci (born 11 May 1982 in Vicenza) is a former Italian professional road bicycle racer, who competed between 2002 and 2010.

Major results

2004
 Coppi e Bartali – Team Time Trial
2005
 Coppi e Bartali – Team Time Trial

Tour de France results 
2005 – 144th

Notes and references

Italian male cyclists
1982 births
Living people
Sportspeople from Vicenza
Cyclists from the Province of Vicenza